Fondren may refer to:

 Fondren Library, main library of Rice University
 Fondren Southwest, Houston
 Fondren (name)